Kavmeleh (also Romanized as Kāvmeleh and Kāvmaleh; also known as Karamela and Karmaleh) is a village in Chehel Cheshmeh-ye Gharbi Rural District, Sarshiv District, Saqqez County, Kurdistan Province, Iran. At the 2006 census, its population was 170, in 30 families. The village is populated by Kurds.

References 

Towns and villages in Saqqez County
Kurdish settlements in Kurdistan Province